Michael David Holton (born August 4, 1961) is an American former professional basketball player, and current television studio analyst for the Portland Trail Blazers of the NBA. Born  in Seattle, Washington, he played college basketball at University of California, Los Angeles (UCLA) from 1979 to 1983, and was selected in the third round of the 1983 NBA draft by the Golden State Warriors, but began his NBA career with the Phoenix Suns in 1984–85. Holton, a 6'4"  guard, also spent his career with the Chicago Bulls, Portland Trail Blazers, and Charlotte Hornets. He also played in the CBA for four teams in as many seasons from 1983 to 1992. He started 60 games for the expansion Charlotte Hornets.  Holton briefly played for Great Taste Coffee in the Philippine Basketball Association.

Coaching career
In 2001, Holton became head coach of the University of Portland men's basketball team, where he had served as an assistant coach in 1994–95. He was also an assistant coach at Pasadena City College in 1993–94, at Oregon State University in 1995–96, and at UCLA from 1996 until 2001.

Holton was fired in March 2006 after leading the Portland Pilots to a 54–91 win–loss record over five seasons. He still had three years remaining on his contract.

In 2013, Holton became coach of the MAC Masters basketball team, where he's earned two PCAC titles and a 2013 National Championship.

Broadcasting career
Michael Holton is currently employed by Comcast SportsNet as a television analyst for the Portland Trail Blazers.

Teaching career
From September 1993 to June 1994, Holton was also a 7th grade English teacher at Charles W. Eliot Middle School in Pasadena, CA.

Head coaching record

Notes

External links
College and NBA stats @ basketballreference.com
Michael Holton's website

1961 births
Living people
20th-century African-American sportspeople
21st-century African-American people
African-American basketball coaches
African-American basketball players
American expatriate basketball people in the Philippines
American men's basketball coaches
American men's basketball players
Basketball coaches from Washington (state)
Basketball players from Seattle
Charlotte Hornets players
Chicago Bulls players
College men's basketball head coaches in the United States
Florida Stingers players
Golden State Warriors draft picks
Great Taste Coffee Makers players
Oregon State Beavers men's basketball coaches
Parade High School All-Americans (boys' basketball)
Pasadena City Lancers men's basketball coaches
Pasadena High School (California) alumni
Philippine Basketball Association imports
Phoenix Suns players
Point guards
Portland Pilots men's basketball coaches
Portland Trail Blazers players
Puerto Rico Coquis players
Shooting guards
Tri-City Chinook players
Tulsa Fast Breakers players
UCLA Bruins men's basketball coaches
UCLA Bruins men's basketball players